Cyrtopogon montanus is a species of robber flies in the family Asilidae.

Subspecies
These two subspecies belong to the species Cyrtopogon montanus:
 Cyrtopogon montanus montanus Loew, 1874 i g
 Cyrtopogon montanus wilcoxi James, 1942 i g
Data sources: i = ITIS, c = Catalogue of Life, g = GBIF, b = Bugguide.net

References

Asilidae
Articles created by Qbugbot
Insects described in 1874